David Tanenbaum may refer to:
David Tanenbaum (born 1956), American classical guitarist
David M. Tanenbaum, American experimental physicist